William M. Neill (born March 15, 1959) is a former nose tackle in the National Football League (NFL) who played for the New York Giants and the Green Bay Packers.  Neill played collegiate ball at the University of Pittsburgh before being drafted by the New York Giants in the 5th round of the 1981 NFL Draft.  He played professionally for 4 seasons and retired in 1984.

References

1959 births
Living people
People from Norristown, Pennsylvania
Players of American football from Pennsylvania
American football defensive linemen
Pittsburgh Panthers football players
New York Giants players
Green Bay Packers players
Sportspeople from Montgomery County, Pennsylvania